Bhundi Tekari is a village in Mohania block of Kaimur district, Bihar, India. As of 2011, its population was 1,140, in 144 households.

References 

Villages in Kaimur district